Mentor Zhubi (born 1 May 1984) is a Swedish International Futsal player and a football player of Kosovar Albanian descent.

Football
He is currently playing for Västra Frölunda in Swedish Division 3.

Futsal
Zhubi is also a Futsal player for Gothenburg team FC Ibra and the Swedish national team. In 2012 FC Ibra won the Swedish Futsal Championship and Mentor Zhubi was chosen Player of the Year.

International
He made his international Futsal debut for Sweden on December 11, 2012 against France.

Personal life
He's the older brother of Åtvidabergs FF's Petrit Zhubi.

Honors

Futsal
FC Ibra
Swedish Futsal Champion (1): 2012

Individual
Player of the year (1): 2012

References

External links
  (archive)
 
 

1984 births
Living people
Swedish footballers
Swedish people of Kosovan descent
Swedish people of Albanian descent
Swedish men's futsal players
Swedish international futsal players
Swedish expatriates in Iceland
Örgryte IS players
IK Oddevold players
Expatriate footballers in Iceland
FC Ibra players
Association football midfielders